ICFAI University, Dehradun (IUD), or in its fuller name Institute of Chartered Financial Analysts of India University, Dehradun, is a private university located in the city of Dehradun, in north Indian state of Uttarakhand. It was established in 2003 and is  organised into four institutes, which are as ICFAI Law School (ILS), ICFAI Business School (IBS), ICFAI Tech School (ITS), and ICFAI Education School (IEds).

History
ICFAI University, Dehradun was established in 2003 by the Institute of Chartered Financial Analysts of India (ICFAI), an educational society, under the ICFAI University Act, 2003.

Campus infrastructure 
The IUD campus is at Selaqui, in Dehradun. It has  of built-up area with academic blocks, workshops, laboratories, faculty rooms, auditorium, seminar halls, computer labs, library, and other student facilities. The campus is capable of accommodating up to 3,000 students.

Affiliation 
Like all universities in India, ICFAI University, Dehradun is recognised by the University Grants Commission (UGC). The University is a recognised member of Association of Commonwealth Universities (ACU) and the Association of Indian Universities (AIU).

Schools

ICFAI Law School
The ICFAI Law School, formerly the Faculty of Law, is a constituent of the university. It offers a five-year LL.B (Hons.), three-year LL.B (Hons.) and one-year LL.M.

ICFAI Tech School
The ICFAI Tech School (ITS), formerly the Faculty of Science and Technology, is a constituent of the university. It commenced operations in 2004. It offers Ph.D., M.Tech  and B.Tech. programs.

It conducts the Admission Test for IcfaiTech (ATIT), in online and written formats, for its B. Tech. program. The eligibility to enter IcfaiTech Dehradun campus is to have a minimum of 60% in 10+2 or equivalent with Physics, Chemistry, Mathematics and English as mandatory subjects.

ICFAI Business School

The ICFAI Business School (IBS), formerly the Faculty of Management, is a constituent of the university. It commenced operations in 2004. It offers an MBA Program.

ICFAI Education School

The ICFAI Education School (IEdS), formerly the Faculty of Education, is a constituent of the university. It commenced operations in 2004. It offers a B. Ed. program. The program is approved by the National Council for Teacher Education (NCTE) and National Assessment and Accreditation Council (NAAC).

Ranking
 
The university's constituent college, ICFAI Law School, was ranked 23 by India Todays "India's Best Colleges 2018: Law".

See also
 List of law schools in India

References

External links 

Universities in Uttarakhand
Universities and colleges in Dehradun
2003 establishments in Uttarakhand
Educational institutions established in 2003